Naperville Central High School (Naperville Central or NCHS) is a four-year public high school located in Naperville, Illinois, a western suburb of Chicago. The school, which enrolls students in grades nine through twelve, is a part of the Naperville Community Unit School District 203.

The school, notable for its strong academic standing and history of athletic accomplishments, has been ranked in the top 3% of high schools nationally by U.S. News & World Report.

History
The present NCHS structure is on Aurora Avenue just outside the downtown business district in Naperville. The building is within walking distance of the Naperville Riverwalk park/trail network, and is just north of Knoch Park and the Edward Hospital campus. The school is across the street from the historic Naper Settlement.

Naperville High school was established in 1916. The oldest part of the current building, known by some as the "3-Story Wing,"  was constructed in 1950.

The current Naperville Central building has received building additions in 1955, 1963, 1968, 1987, 1992 and 2009. For the 1992–93 school year, three projects in three independent locations added a Student Services wing in the northeast part of the building (demolished in the summer of 2010 to make way for an addition), an auditorium in the northwest part of the building and a natatorium in the southern part of the building. Prior additions included a field house and renovations to the former student cafeteria area in the late 1980s, the former school library, and a large single-story classroom wing, known as the Flat Wing.

There was an increasing concern about the safety and reliability of Naperville Central. Complaints of lack of building organization, aging infrastructure, and inadequate educational spaces cause it to be the main focus of Naperville School District 203's "Facilities Task Force". After a 59% voter passage of a $43 million referendum, the school underwent a massive renovation to completely renovate approximately 75% of the school's footprint. On the 27th of May, 2009 ground was broken on the renovation.  The renovation had the three-story wing undergo a mix of new construction and remodeling in order to house all major subject areas. It also moved and updated the learning resource center, it added physical education and music spaces, it reduced building entrances and put synthetic turf on the football field. At the start of the 2011 school year, renovations were completed, and the school was fully re-opened.

Plagiarism scandal
In 2008, principal Jim Caudill plagiarized a speech he gave to graduating seniors. The speech originally came from Megan Nowicki-Plackett, a teacher at the time who was formerly a student at the school. Earlier in the year, Caudill had fired a newspaper adviser earlier over profanity, which began a free speech debate among the community. The school district ultimately decided to remove Caudill from his principal position and reassign him to oversight of construction during renovations. Caudill was replaced by Bill Wiesbrook the following year. Wiesbrook was hired in 1996 and previously had worked as a dean to students and assistant principal of operations.

Mummy

One of the most notable displays at the school is an Egyptian mummy, also known as "Butch". It is stored in a glass case on the second floor of the school.

The mummy was donated to the school in the 1940s by local doctor, who had purchased it in a curio shop. The mummy was wrapped up and forgotten in an attic at the school until it was accidentally rediscovered by a teacher in 1975. The mummy underwent restoration in the 1990s at the University of Chicago's Oriental Institute.

In 2002, the National Geographic Channel visited the school and featured the school's mummy on an episode of its Mummy Roadshow television series. The mummy dates to approximately 55 BCE.

Demographics
In 2020, 67.0% of the student body identifies as White, 16.6% of the student body identifies as Asian, 8.5% of the student body identifies as Hispanic, 3.9% of the student body identifies as Black, and 4.0% of the student body identifies as another race.

Academics

In 2009, Naperville Central was ranked #1353 on the annual Newsweek Magazine listing of their top 1500 American public high school (based on AP test results and the size of the graduating class).  The school had been ranked #1015 in 2008.

Student life

Athletics 
Naperville Central competes in the DuPage Valley Conference (DVC), and is a member of the Illinois High School Association (IHSA), which governs most interscholastic athletics and competitive activities in the state.  Teams are stylized as the Redhawks.

The school sponsors the following interscholastic teams for young men and women: lacrosse, basketball, cross country, golf, gymnastics, soccer, swimming & diving, tennis, track & field, volleyball, and water polo.  Young men may compete in baseball, football, and wrestling, while young women may compete in badminton and softball.  While not sponsored by the IHSA, the Athletic Department also oversees a competitive poms team for young ladies.

The following teams have won their respective IHSA sponsored state tournament or meet:

 Baseball: 2005–06, 2009–10
 Basketball (girls): 2002–03, 2003–04
 Football: 1999–2000, 2013–14
 Swimming & Diving (boys): 2001–02, 2009–10
 Swimming & Diving (girls): 2004–05, 2005–06
 Tennis (boys): 2016–2017
 Tennis (girls): 1993–94
 Volleyball (boys): 1997–98
 Volleyball (girls): 2005–06, 2007–08
 Water Polo (boys): State Champions 2015–16, 2017–18, 2018-19

In 2010, the Redhawks achieved fame outside of the playing field, as the NCHS football team appeared in the country singer Kenny Chesney's music video, "The Boys of Fall".

In 2021, the IHSA sanctioned the NCHS football team for violations of its transfer bylaws. The result of this sanction was the forfeiture of NCHS football games encompassing all wins in the 2018–19, 2019–20 and 2020–21 seasons, totaling 17 competitions where ineligible players participated. The School accepted full responsibility's for their actions, and implemented revised procedures. Along with the football team, the basketball team also had to forfeit 4 wins in the 2018–19 season due to at least one ineligible player.

Science
The NCHS Science Olympiad Team, founded in 2004, ranked third in the state in 2005 and 2006 and second in state in 2007 and 2008(thus advancing to the national tournament). The Worldwide Youth in Science and Engineering Team won the State Championship in 2006, ending rival Naperville North's multiple-year winning streak. In 2009, Central's WYSE team captured first place at the regional competition held at Naperville North. The Varsity Junior Engineering Technical Society (JETS) TEAMS's team placed first in the nation in 2006; the JV JETS team placed second. In 2009, the Varsity JETS team took 1st place at the regional competition held at IIT (Wheaton Campus), while the JV team took 2nd.

In 2006, four students from NCHS competed in the Toshiba/NSTA Exploravision Competition and were recognized as 2nd Place National Finalist Winners for their design of a Wireless Information Integration network.

Chess
The NCHS chess team placed in 10th in 2010 and respectably in 2005 and 2006, and student Dafe Finster was the Individual State Champion in 2005.

Journalism
The Central Times (CT) student newspaper has won many national National Pacemaker Awards, the high-school journalism version of the Pulitzer Prize. The CT also tied for first in the 2006 IHSA Journalism State competition as well as maintaining their title in 2010. CT staff members have received national awards for their writing, as well as awards from Columbia University.

Notable alumni
Dave Gruber Allen, actor
 Matthew John Armstrong (class of 1991), actor
Casey Krueger (class of 2008) professional soccer player for the United States women's national soccer team and the Chicago Red Stars
 Mark Batterson (class of 1988), pastor and author
 Cameron Brate (class of 2010), tight end for NFL's Tampa Bay Buccaneers
 John Clawson (class of 1963), former ABA small forward; Gold medalist at 1967 Pan American Games and 1968 Summer Olympics.
 Drew Crawford (class of 2009), small forward for Vanoli Cremona of Italy's LBA and 2018–2019 Italian Basketball Cup MVP
 Owen Daniels (class of 2001), retired NFL tight end and member of Super Bowl 50 champion Denver Broncos.
 David Eigenberg (class of 1982), actor, perhaps best known as Steve Brady on television series Sex and the City
 Harry Kalas (class of 1954), Ford C. Frick Award-winning sportscaster, most notably with Philadelphia Phillies (1971–2009)
 Nicky Lopez (class of 2013), 2nd baseman for Major League Baseball's Kansas City Royals
 Elizabeth Lumpkin (class of 2004), former WTA Tour player and current assistant women's tennis coach at the University of Oregon
 Renato Mariotti (class of 1994), legal commentator and former federal prosecutor
 Gary Miller (class of 1974), former sportscaster for ESPN and current anchor at KCBS and KCAL in Los Angeles
 Mary Miller (class of 1978), politician
 Anthony Parker (class of 1993), former NBA small forward;  2004 Israeli Basketball Premier League MVP; current general manager of NBA G League's Lakeland Magic.
 Candace Parker (class of 2004), 1st overall pick in 2008 WNBA Draft, two-time Wooden Award winner in college, two-time Olympic gold medalist, two-time WNBA MVP, current studio analyst for NBA on TNT and current forward for WNBA's Chicago Sky
 Sean Payton (class of 1982), former head coach of NFL's New Orleans Saints and winning coach of Super Bowl XLIV
 Mark Pearson (class of 1975), agricultural journalist on radio and television
Jayden Reed (class of 2018), current American football wide receiver for Michigan State University
 Paul Sereno (class of 1975), paleontologist
 Joe Swanberg (class of 1999), film director
 Tim Szatko (class of 1999), professional basketball player
Payton Thorne(class of 2019), current American football quarterback for Michigan State University
 Paula Zahn (class of 1974), television newscaster
 Robert Zoellick (class of 1971), government functionary and former President of World Bank (2007–2012)

References

External links

Naperville Central High School
Naperville Community Unit School District 203
NCHS Athletic Website

Public high schools in Illinois
Educational institutions established in 1863
Education in Naperville, Illinois
Schools in DuPage County, Illinois
1863 establishments in Illinois